Albania–Croatia relations are diplomatic relations between the Republic of Albania and the Republic of Croatia were established on August 25, 1992. Albania has an embassy in Zagreb and an honorary consulate in Dubrovnik while Croatia has an embassy in Tirana.

Both countries are full members of the Council of Europe, Union for the Mediterranean and NATO. In addition, Albania is an official candidate for accession to the European Union of which Croatia is a full member. Croatia strongly supports Albania in its euro-integration path.

Albania became one of the first countries to announce the recognition of the sovereign state of Croatia on January 21, 1992. Many ethnic-Albanian volunteers fought alongside Croats in Croatian War of Independence, the most notably including Agim Çeku and Rahim Ademi.

Albanians in Croatia are officially recognized as a minority by the Croatian Constitution and therefore have their own permanent seat in the Croatian Parliament. According to the 2011 census, 17,513 people of Albanian descent were living in Croatia.

Political 

In April 2009, both countries became full members of NATO at an event which both Albanian Prime Minister Sali Berisha and Croatian Prime Minister Ivo Sanader attended. In the same year, the two countries decided to build a joint Nuclear Power Plant on the Albanian border with Montenegro. This decision was greeted warily by the government of Montenegro, which is worried about the plant's environmental impact. The two have a history of defense pacts, and overall theirs is a good relationship.

The Albanian flag was held and flown in the 20th anniversary of Operation Storm also known as Victory Day of Croatia, to acknowledge the support of Albanians in the Croatian War for Independence. Croatia reaffirmed Albania of its close alliance through this action.

Another major factor in the relationship is historic and current Albanian emigration to Croatia, including the centuries-old Arbanasi community.
In July 2016 an Albanian middle-school was inaugurated in Zadar for the Arbanasi people living there and books in Albanian were delivered from the Albanian Embassy in Zagreb. More than 50 pupils started their studies in the Albanian school for the school year 2016–2017.

Three Albanian presidents (Rexhep Meidani, Alfred Moisiu and Bamir Topi) were awarded the highest honor of the Republic of Croatia, Grand Order of King Tomislav.

Economy 
Albania and Croatia have discussed the possibility of jointly building a nuclear power plant at Lake Shkoder, close to the border with Montenegro, a plan that has gathered criticism from Montenegro due to seismicity in the area.

A close economical cooperation of Albania and Croatia is existent. In 2014, the trading volume was about was 46.330 million euros. An increasing number of Croatian companies are investing in Albania. In 2013, 13.870 million euros of direct investment came from Croatia to Albania. In addition, major Albanian companies are expanding to Croatia.

Visits

See also 
 Foreign relations of Albania
 Foreign relations of Croatia
 Albanians of Croatia
 Croatian War of Independence
 Albania–NATO relations 
 Croatia–NATO relations
 2009 enlargement of NATO
 Albania–Yugoslavia relations
 Accession of Albania to the European Union

External links 
 Albanian Embassy in Zagreb
  Croatian Ministry of Foreign Affairs: List of bilateral treaties with Albania

References 

 
Croatia 
Bilateral relations of Croatia